Azizak Rural District is a rural district (dehestan) in Bahnemir District, Babolsar County, Mazandaran Province, Iran. At the 2006 census, its population was 3,860, in 1,040 families. The rural district has 1 village.

References 

Rural Districts of Mazandaran Province
Babolsar County